The following lists events from 2012 in Malta.

Incumbents
President: George Abela
Prime Minister: Lawrence Gonzi

January

February

•February 23–27: The 2012 Maltese Carnival was held

March

March 8: Tvm Hd was launched as the first Hd channel with changing logos for Tvm and Tvm 2 (as Education 22)

March 25: Malta International Airport celebrated 20 years of its service.

April

May

June

•June 29: Mater Dei celebrated its 5 Year anniversary.

July
24 July – The St. Elmo Bridge is inaugurated in Valletta.

August
Malta competed in the 2012 Summer Olympics from July 27 to August 12.

September

•September 29–30: The 2012 airshow was held with Air Malta's new livery shown in the airshow.

October

November
The 2012 Battle of Malta took place in November 2012.

December

•December 10: Lewis Hamilton came to Malta with driving a Vodafone McLaren F1 car.

•December 26: L-Istrina 2012 was held.

•December 31: Nye 2013 was held in Valletta.

See also
Malta in the Eurovision Song Contest 2012
2011–12 Maltese Premier League
2011–12 Maltese FA Trophy
Public holidays in Malta
2012 films shot in Malta
New project by Vodafone Malta (2012)
Mayors who were the mayors of a city or village in 2012

References

External links
Malta Events - Full Calendar of Events in Malta|Visit Malta

 
Years of the 21st century in Malta
Malta